Louis Billouart, Chevalier de Kerlérec (1704–1770) was a career French naval officer with 25 years experience who was appointed as the governor of the French colony of Louisiana, serving from 1753 to 1763. The former governor, Pierre François de Rigaud, Marquis de Vaudreuil-Cavagnal, was promoted to the post of Governor of New France. Kerlérec was a minor aristocrat from Quimper, Finistère. In the late 1750s, during the Seven Years' War, he got into conflict with other officials and had three men recalled to France. They ultimately secured the support of the government, which recalled Kerlérec in 1763 and exiled him from Paris for a year. He was exonerated and remained in Paris for his last years.

Colonial career
Kerlérec had to struggle in greater than usual isolation during his administration, as the French government was immersed in conducting the Seven Years' War (1756 to 1763) in Europe. This added to the difficulties of communication by ship, where travel took weeks. In addition, the government was conducting the war in North America, where it was known as the French and Indian War, and struggling to maintain its alliances with certain Indian tribes against the British. Kerlérec took precautions to defend the small French colony from a possible British attack by erecting a palisade around New Orleans, rebuilding the battery at English Turn on the Mississippi River, and anchoring an old ship at the mouth of the river at the Gulf Coast. It could be sunk to prevent entry by English ships. However, Kerlérec's request for more troops went unanswered.

Kerlérec tightened his discipline over the troops already stationed in the colony. During his governorship, relations between the Jesuit and the Capuchin orders in the colony were strained, and the local Indian tribes threatened to switch allegiances to the British if they were not provided with more supplies and trade goods. Kerlérec tried to hire Swiss mercenaries for defense, but the Commissary-Commissioner, Vincent de Rochemore, refused to pay for them. This was one of several public disagreements which they had.

After a few years of not receiving communications or supplies from France, the colony learned that France had ceded Louisiana to the Spanish as a result of the French and Indian War, and to avoid being forced to give up control to Great Britain, which had defeated France. Kerlérec  and Rochemore had many public quarrels; the latter accused Kerlerec of stealing money from the colony's treasury and acting as a dictator. Kerlérec ordered Rochemore and two allies (treasurer and comptroller Jean Baptiste d'Estrehan and Antoine Philippe de Marigny) recalled to France, but they succeeded in turning the government against him. Kerlérec was recalled to France and thrown into prison in 1763. He was exiled from Paris in 1769 but was exonerated a year later. Kerlérec then returned to Paris where he died in 1770.

Legacy
A street in  New Orleans' 7th Ward is named for Kerlérec. It goes from Chartres Street in the Faubourg Marigny neighborhood, north to Dorgenois Street. Due to developments over the years, the road is "broken" and does not run straight through its original course.

References

Davis, Edwin Adams. Louisiana the Pelican State. Baton Rouge: Louisiana State University Press, 1961. LCCN 59:9088.
Hervé Gourmelon. Le chevalier de Kerlérec. L’affaire de la Louisiane. Rennes:Les Portes du large, novembre 2003. Second edition, février 2004. Collection Bretons à travers le monde

External links
Timeline of Kerlerec's Life
Governor Kerlerec, La Louisiane Française 1682-1803] website (French)

Governors of Louisiana (New France)
People of New France
People from Quimper
1704 births
1770 deaths